Flora's Very Windy Day is a children's picture book by Jeanne Birdsall. It is illustrated by Matt Phelan. The two main characters in the book are Flora and her little brother Crispin, both of whom are blown away by the wind.

References

2010 children's books
American picture books
Children's fiction books
Books by Jeanne Birdsall